Highland Township is a township in Greene County, Iowa, USA.

History
Highland Township was established in 1872.

References

Townships in Greene County, Iowa
Townships in Iowa
1872 establishments in Iowa
Populated places established in 1872